The Aichi E3A was a reconnaissance seaplane developed in Germany as the Heinkel HD 56 to operate from warships of the Imperial Japanese Navy, which designated it the Type 90-1 Reconnaissance Seaplane. It was a conventional single-bay biplane with staggered wings braced by N-type interplane struts. The pilot and gunner sat in tandem, open cockpits.

Design and development
Aichi Tokei Denki requested a design for a reconnaissance seaplane from Heinkel to enter in an IJN competition. Heinkel built a single HD 56 prototype that was evaluated against the Nakajima E4N and the Kawanishi E5K. The Heinkel design was announced the winner in 1931, on the condition that Aichi would address some shortcomings, particularly a lack of range. Refined versions of the "losing" Nakajima and Kawanishi designs would eventually see production, with the Nakajima design being built in far greater numbers.

Modifications to the HD 56 by Aichi included reductions in length and span, the replacement of the prototype's Wright Whirlwind with a locally-built Hitachi Tempu, and numerous detail changes. Flight tests were carried out at Nagoya in August 1931, and the type was accepted into service the following year. E3As were still in service aboard Sendai class cruisers at the beginning of the Second Sino-Japanese War.

Specifications (E3A1)

Notes

References

1920s German military reconnaissance aircraft
Floatplanes
Heinkel aircraft
E03A
Biplanes
Single-engined tractor aircraft
Aircraft first flown in 1929